Jacob Jensen (born 26 May 1973 in Holbæk) is a Danish politician, who is a member of the Folketing for the Venstre political party. He was elected into parliament at the 2005 Danish general election.

Political career
Jensen was elected into parliament in the 2005 election, and reelected in the 2007, 2011, 2015 and 2019 elections.

External links 
 Biography on the website of the Danish Parliament (Folketinget)

References 

1973 births
Living people
People from Holbæk Municipality
Venstre (Denmark) politicians
Members of the Folketing 2005–2007
Members of the Folketing 2007–2011
Members of the Folketing 2011–2015
Members of the Folketing 2015–2019
Members of the Folketing 2019–2022
Members of the Folketing 2022–2026